Prescyllia Engala Lokako (born 30 December 1991) is a Congolese handball player for Aulnay Handball and the DR Congo national team.

She represented DR Congo at the 2019 World Women's Handball Championship.

References

1991 births
Living people
Democratic Republic of the Congo female handball players
Expatriate handball players
Democratic Republic of the Congo expatriate sportspeople in France